Andraž Kirm (born 6 September 1984) is a Slovenian professional footballer who plays as a midfielder. Besides Slovenia, he has played in Poland, the Netherlands, and Cyprus.

Club career

Slovenia
Kirm started his career at Šmartno, and moved to Slovan in 2002. In 2004, he left for another club based in the Slovenian capital, Svoboda, where he established himself as a first team player. His talent didn't go unnoticed and he subsequently joined the Slovenian first division club Domžale in the summer of 2005. In his first 2005–06 season, he made 29 league appearances for the eventual league runners-up. In the following campaigns (2006–07 and 2007–08), he won back-to-back championships with Domžale as well as winning the 2007 Slovenian Supercup. In the 2008–09 season, Kirm led the league in assists.

Wisła Kraków
On 2 July 2009, he moved to Ekstraklasa champions Wisła Kraków for an undisclosed fee from Domžale and signed for five years. He immediately established himself as a regular in the team, playing in all 37 competition matches in the 2009–10 season, while Wisła finished second in the league.  In the following campaign, he won the Ekstraklasa championship with Wisła Kraków and was the club's top goalscorer with nine goals in the league.

Groningen
On 30 August 2012, Kirm was transferred to Eredivisie club Groningen until 2014.

Omonoia
In 2014, after his contract with Groningen ended, Kirm moved to Cypriot First Division club Omonoia. He scored eleven league goals in two seasons, and left the club in 2016 when his contract ended.

Olimpija Ljubljana
On 25 June 2016, he signed for Slovenian champions Olimpija Ljubljana.

International career
Kirm made his debut for the Slovenia national team in August 2007 in a friendly against Montenegro in Podgorica. In his second appearance for the national team, Kirm provided the assist for Milivoje Novaković's goal in a 3–0 UEFA Euro 2008 qualifying win over Luxembourg. Since then, he has become one of the most important players of the team led by Matjaž Kek. Kirm was the only player, besides Novaković, who played in all 2010 FIFA World Cup qualification matches. He also appeared in the starting lineup in both play-off matches with Russia, after which Slovenia qualified for the final tournament. At the 2010 FIFA World Cup, he played in all three group stage games.

Career statistics

Club
Updated 1 July 2014

International 
Scores and results list Slovenia's goal tally first, score column indicates score after each Kirm goal.

Honours
Domžale
PrvaLiga: 2006–07, 2007–08
Slovenian Supercup: 2007

Wisła Kraków
Ekstraklasa: 2010–11

See also
Slovenian international players

References

External links

Player profile at NZS 

1984 births
Living people
Footballers from Ljubljana
Slovenian footballers
Association football midfielders
Slovenia international footballers
Slovenia under-21 international footballers
2010 FIFA World Cup players
NK Svoboda Ljubljana players
NK Domžale players
Wisła Kraków players
FC Groningen players
AC Omonia players
NK Olimpija Ljubljana (2005) players
NK Bravo players
Slovenian Second League players
Slovenian PrvaLiga players
Ekstraklasa players
Eredivisie players
Cypriot First Division players
Slovenian expatriate footballers
Slovenian expatriate sportspeople in Poland
Expatriate footballers in Poland
Slovenian expatriate sportspeople in the Netherlands
Expatriate footballers in the Netherlands
Slovenian expatriate sportspeople in Cyprus
Expatriate footballers in Cyprus